The Buffet is an oil-on-canvas still life painting executed in 1728 by Jean Siméon Chardin. It and The Ray were Chardin's reception pieces to the Académie royale de peinture et de sculpture; both are now in the Louvre.

References

1728 paintings
Paintings by Jean-Baptiste-Siméon Chardin
Paintings in the Louvre by French artists
Dogs in art
Still life paintings